Fataho Nerie (born 12 December 2008) is a Ghanaian footballer who currently plays as a midfielder for Ghana Premier League side Aduana Stars.

Club career
Nerie became the youngest player to ever feature in the Ghana Premier League when he made his debut on 11 September 2022 against Hearts of Oak, aged 13 years, 8 months and 30 days.

Career statistics

Club

Notes

References

2008 births
Living people
Ghanaian footballers
Association football midfielders
Ghana Premier League players
Aduana Stars F.C. players